Pep & Rash is a Dutch DJ and production duo from Goes, a small town in Zeeland, composed of Jesse van de Ketterij and Rachid El Uarichi.

Discography

Charting singles

Other Singles
 2013: Rocksus [NewLight Records]
 2013: Hai Hai Hai [Bongo Tone]
 2013: Epifania (with Funky Ro) [Bongo Tone]
 2013: Te Te Ma [Bongo Tone]
 2013: Unda (with Santos Suarez) [Moganga]
 2014: Fatality (Quintino Edit) [SPRS]
 2015: Rumors [Spinnin' Deep]
 2015: Red Roses [Spinnin' Records]
 2015: Red Roses (Let Her Go) (Vocal Edit) [Spinnin' Records]
 2015: Sugar (with Shermanology) [Spinnin' Deep]
 2015: White Rabbit (with Sander van Doorn) [Spinnin' Records]
 2016: Love The One You're With [Spinnin' Records]
 2016: Enigma (with Lucas & Steve) [Spinnin' Records]
 2016: Echo (with Polina) [Spinnin' Records]
 2017: The Stars Are Mine (with Chocolate Puma) [Spinnin' Deep]
 2017: Feel Alive (with Lucas & Steve) [Spinnin' Records]
 2017: Break Down (featuring D-Double) [Musical Freedom]
 2017: Underground [Future House Music]
 2017: Ruff Like This (with Watermät) [Spinnin' Deep]
 2018: Bombaclat [Spinnin' Records]
2018: Together Forever (with Chocolate Puma) [Spinnin' Records]
 2019: Bang Beatz [Musical Freedom]
2019: Guestlist (with Bram Fidder) [Spinnin' Deep]
2019: Gold Rush (featuring PolyAnna & Nomad) [Spinnin' Records]
2019: Da Fck You Lookin' At!
2019: Waiting For A Sign [Spinnin' Records]
 2020: Are You Down [Heldeep Records]
 2022: Jimmy Choo [Heldeep Records]

Remixes
 2013: Jay Ennes, Troy Denari - When You Say This (Pep & Rash UK Mix) [Madhouse Records]
 2013: Santos Suarez - Pipa (Pep & Rash Remix) [Bongo Tone]
 2014: R3hab, Trevor Guthrie - Soundwave [Spinnin' Remixes]
 2015: Tchami featuring Kaleem Taylor - Promesses (Pep & Rash Remix) [Fool's Gold Records]
 2015: Alesso - Sweet Escape (Pep & Rash Remix) [Refune Records]
 2015: Hardwell, Headhunterz featuring Haris - Nothing Can Hold Us Down (Pep & Rash Remix) [Revealed Recordings]
 2017: The Knocks featuring Sam Nelson Harris - HEAT'' (Pep & Rash Remix) [Big Beat/Neon Gold]

References

Sources

External links
Official website
Beatport

Dutch DJs
Dutch house musicians
Electronic music duos
House musicians
Dutch musical duos
Spinnin' Records artists
Progressive house musicians
Future house musicians
Electronic dance music DJs